King of the Wild Stallions is a 1959 American CinemaScope Western film directed by R. G. Springsteen and starring George Montgomery.

Plot
A wild stallion provides unexpected help to a widow and her young son in their efforts to keep their ranch.

Cast
 George Montgomery as Randy Burke
 Diane Brewster as Martha Morse
 Edgar Buchanan as Idaho
 Emile Meyer as Matt Macguire
 Jerry Hartleben as Bucky Morse
 Byron Foulger as A.B. Orcutt
 Denver Pyle as Doc Webber
 Dan Sheridan as Woody Baines
 Rory Mallinson as	Sheriff Cap Fellows

See also
 List of American films of 1959

References

External links

1959 films
1959 Western (genre) films
American Western (genre) films
1950s English-language films
1950s American films